Kalikaalam may refer to:
 Kalikaalam (2012 film), a Malayalam drama film
 Kalikaalam (1992 film), an Indian Tamil-language drama film
 Kalikkalam, a 1990 Indian Malayalam-language action thriller film
 Kalikalam, a 1991 Telugu film